Zagradinje is a village in the municipality of Ravno, Bosnia and Herzegovina.

Demographics 
According to the 2013 census, its population was nil, down from 24 in 1991.

References

Populated places in Ravno, Bosnia and Herzegovina